Lincolnshire is a county that is mainly in the East Midlands of England

Lincolnshire may also refer to:

Lincolnshire, Illinois, United States
Lincolnshire, Kentucky, United States
Lincolnshire Management, a private equity firm based in New York, United States
The Lincolnshire, a historic mansion in Andover, Massachusetts, United States

See also
"The Lincolnshire Poacher", a traditional English folk song
Lincolnshire Poacher (numbers station), a shortwave radio station